The Graf-Münster-Gymnasium is the largest high school in Bayreuth. The school currently has 1400 students and was founded in 1833.

The school was named after Count (Graf) Georg zu Münster (1776–1844), a local paleontologist.

Educational institutions established in 1833
Schools in Bavaria
Bayreuth
1833 establishments in Bavaria